Ashley Victoria Benson (born December 18, 1989) is an American actress, model, and singer. She is known for her role as Hanna Marin in the teen mystery-drama series Pretty Little Liars (2010–2017). Benson has starred in films, including Bring It On: In It to Win It (2007), Christmas Cupid (2010), Spring Breakers (2012), Ratter (2015), Chronically Metropolitan (2016), Her Smell (2018), and Private Property (2022). She has received various accolades, including four Teen Choice Awards, a Young Hollywood Award, as well as three People's Choice Award nominations.

Early life
Benson was born on December 18, 1989, in Anaheim Hills, California to parents Shannon and Jeff Benson. She has an older sister, Shaylene.

Career

2000s: Early work and recognition
Benson began dancing competitively at age three, studying ballet, jazz, tap and hip hop. She began singing in choirs and musicals at a young age, performing a solo at her church at age four. When she was eight years old she signed with Ford Models, and appeared in a number of print ads.

Benson appeared on the daytime soap Days of Our Lives as Abigail Deveraux from 2004 to 2007.

Benson made her big screen debut with a bit part in the 2004 comedy 13 Going on 30. She starred as Carson in Bring It On: In It to Win It (2007), the fourth installment of the Bring It On franchise. The role required her to both overcome her fear of heights to perform the cheerleading stunts, and to end her contract with Days of our Lives:

She recalled working on a film set instead of a soap opera set "definitely weird", because she would spend days working on one or two scenes, whereas on the Days of Our Lives set, she filmed two or three episodes a day. For Bring It On: In It to Win It, she had to attend cheerleading practice, which was "hard for [her], because [she is] afraid of heights." Nonetheless, she was "glad" to do her own stunts, even though she "wasn't expecting it to be so hard."

In 2008, she appeared in the Lifetime original film Fab Five: The Texas Cheerleader Scandal, where she played head cheerleader Brooke Tippit, a character loosely inspired by Karrissa Theret of the Fab Five. The film is based on a true story which took place at McKinney North High School in Texas. She became good friends with her onscreen mother Tatum O'Neal, from whom she learned about acting. Furthermore, she was excited to land a supporting role in Bart Got a Room, which aired mainly on film festivals in 2008 before having a limited release in 2009, because it allowed her to work with William H. Macy. She also played a witch disguised as a cheerleader in a 2008 episode of The CW series Supernatural.

In 2009, Benson starred in ABC's short-lived supernatural comedy television series Eastwick. The show was based on John Updike's novel, The Witches of Eastwick, and the 1987 film adaption of the same name. The series only lasted 11 episodes before ABC cancelled the series due to low ratings but has since gained a cult following.

2010s: Transition to drama and breakthrough

In December 2009, Benson was cast as Hanna Marin in the ABC Family mystery-thriller teen drama series Pretty Little Liars, based on the novel series by Sara Shepard. Hanna is the "diva" and "It girl" of the group, having taken Alison DiLaurentis' place as the most popular girl at Rosewood High in Alison's absence. The series premiered to 2.47 million viewers with Benson's performance being praised by critics. She also received a number of awards and nominations. Benson reprised the role in the spin-off series Ravenswood in two episodes.

In 2010, Benson starred in the television film Christmas Cupid alongside Christina Milian and Chad Michael Murray, which also aired on ABC Family. In January 2012, Benson was cast in the film Spring Breakers, after Emma Roberts dropped out due to creative reasons. The film centers on four college students who are arrested and bailed out by a drug and arms dealer, who sends them out to do some dirty work on spring break. The film co-starred Selena Gomez, Vanessa Hudgens, and James Franco. Filming took place in March and April 2012, and the film was released in March 2013.

In the January 21, 2013, episode of the CBS sitcom How I Met Your Mother, Benson appeared as Carly Whittaker, Barney Stinson's half-sister who dated Ted Mosby. That same month, Benson became the face of eveningwear designer Faviana.

She starred in the 2015 independent horror thriller film Ratter, playing Emma Taylor, a girl who is stalked through her technological devices. That same year, she also appeared in Pixels as Lady Lisa, a fictional game character brought to life. In 2016, Benson appeared in the biographical comedy-drama film Elvis & Nixon as Margaret.

In 2018, it was announced that Benson would star alongside Cara Delevingne and Elisabeth Moss in Alex Ross Perry's music drama film Her Smell, and the film received generally positive reviews, with Benson becoming a contender for the Academy Award for Best Supporting Actress. For the film's soundtrack, Benson did all her own vocals.

2020s: Music ventures and later return to film
In 2020, Benson was featured on "Creep" by G-Eazy, a cover version of the Radiohead song. She also appeared in the music videos previously for NLT's "That Girl", One Call's "Black Light", and Hot Chelle Rae's "Honestly".

Personal life
Benson's former co-star and friend Tyler Blackburn revealed in 2019 that the two of them briefly dated while working together on Pretty Little Liars but that they ultimately remained "good friends". From 2018 to 2020, Benson was in a high-profile relationship with English model Cara Delevingne. She dated rapper G-Eazy from 2020 to 2021. Benson has been in a relationship with Brandon Davis (grandson of late billionaire Marvin Davis) since February 2023. She currently resides in Los Angeles.

Filmography

Film

Television

Web

Music videos

Discography

Songwriting credits

Awards and nominations

References

External links

 
 
 Ashley Benson spokesmodel for Faviana

1989 births
21st-century American actresses
21st-century American singers
Actresses from Anaheim, California
Actresses from Orange County, California
American child actresses
American child models
American female dancers
American film actresses
American soap opera actresses
American television actresses
Dancers from California
Female models from California
Living people
Orange County School of the Arts alumni
People from Anaheim Hills, California
RCA Records artists
Singers from California
LGBT models
Bisexual actresses
Bisexual dancers
Bisexual singers
American LGBT singers
LGBT people from California
American bisexual actors